The 1936 United States presidential election in Texas took place on November 3, 1936, as part of the 1936 United States presidential election. Texas voters chose 23 representatives, or electors, to the Electoral College, who voted for president and vice president.

Texas was won by incumbent President Franklin D. Roosevelt (D–New York), with 87.08% of the popular vote, over Governor Alf Landon (R–Kansas), with 12.32% of the popular vote, a landslide victory margin of 74.76%. Despite the overwhelming Democratic victory here, however, Landon performed better than fellow Republican Herbert Hoover 4 years earlier in 1932, with the state swinging about 2 points towards the GOP, and he managed to flip both Gillespie County and Kendall County back into the Republican column, the latter remaining with the party ever since. 

By percentage of the popular vote won, Texas was Roosevelt's fifth-best state, behind South Carolina, Mississippi, Louisiana, and Georgia.

Results

Results by county

See also
 United States presidential elections in Texas

Notes

References

Texas
1936
1936 Texas elections